Stade Géitz was a football stadium in Wiltz, in north-western Luxembourg. It used to be the home stadium of FC Wiltz 71, before they moved into the Stade Am Pëtz in nearby Weidingen.  The stadium had a capacity of 2,000.

References
World Stadiums - Luxembourg

Buildings and structures in Wiltz
Geitz